Carolina Morán Gordillo (born 30 December 30 1987) is a Mexican actress, model and beauty pageant titleholder who placed as the second runner-up in the 57th Miss World pageant on December 1, 2007, in Sanya, China.

Morán, who stands 1.78 m tall, competed in the national beauty pageant Nuestra Belleza México, held in Tampico, Tamaulipas on September 2, 2006, and obtained the title of Miss Mexico World after placing second to Rosa María Ojeda of the state of Sinaloa. She placed third (second runner-up) in the 2007 Miss World pageant, obtaining the title of Miss World Americas 2007 the pageant winner was Zhang Zilin of China.

References

1987 births
Living people
Nuestra Belleza México winners
People from Manzanillo, Colima
Miss World 2007 delegates
Mexican beauty pageant winners